Show Me the Happy (Traditional Chinese: (依家有喜) is a 2010 TVB modern sitcom series.

Plot
"Family Style," is a dedicated medical clinic ran by the Chai's family three siblings after the death of their parents. Oldest sister Anna Chai Chuen (Michelle Yim) deals with all the administrative management of the clinic. Second sister and an obstetrician Anita Chai Sam (Annie Liu) has high expectations on all people and situations. Third brother and a pediatrician Andy Chai Cheung (Roger Kwok) is frivolous. The three siblings treat their colleagues just like family.

In addition to the three siblings there is retired surgeon oldest brother-in-law (Paul Chun), the accomplished plastic surgeon who is heads over heels for the second sister, the undercover pretty nurse (Bernice Liu) and the next generation family physicians and clinic staff. The complicated and subtle relationships causes different small life stories. The so-called "doctors cannot be self-doctor", the group of elite physicians have to face their own personality flaws, human weaknesses and if you want a cure, what kind of effective strategy do you have?

The daily battle of wits in the clinic between the sisters Anna and Anita leaves little brother Andy stuck in the middle with a headache. In the early years, oldest sister Anita was forced to give up her doctor career and becomes a nurse to look after the family. She paid for her two younger siblings' medical education with the money earned. When the siblings started their own family practice, the two sisters had conflicts and arguments due to their different statuses. Often questions like "Are you the older sister or am I the older sister?" and "Are you the doctor or am I the doctor?" comes up in the arguments.

Cast

Chai Family

God Family

Tong Family

Ching Family

Other cast

Viewership ratings

References

External links
 

TVB dramas
2010 Hong Kong television series debuts
2011 Hong Kong television series endings